BA1 may refer to:

 A postcode district in the BA postcode area
 A flight number associated with British Airways' Concorde service, later used for the BA Club World London City service
 Band Aid (band)
 Lineage BA.1, a variant of the Omicron strain of SARS-CoV-2 that causes COVID-19

See also

 BA (disambiguation)
 b1a (disambiguation)